Hednota demissalis is a moth in the family Crambidae. It was described by Francis Walker in 1863. It is found in Australia, where it has been recorded from Western Australia.

References

Crambinae
Moths described in 1863